Massachusetts was the first U.S. state to issue license plates, on September 1, 1903. Plates are currently issued by the Massachusetts Registry of Motor Vehicles (RMV).

On November 12, 2019, Massachusetts became the final state to issue temporary license plates (designated as type PAS, subtype TP), which can be printed at home & put in the RMV sleeve & affixed to the back of the vehicle. Temporary plates are initially good for 20 days but can be renewed once if permanent plates haven't arrived yet.

All plates since 1978 are currently valid. Prior to 1993, only rear plates were required; since the first "Spirit of America" plate was issued in 1986, front and rear plates have been required since. As such, the 1978-1993 issues continue to only require the rear plate, while the "Spirit of America" issues since 1986 require front and rear plates.

Passenger baseplates

1903 to 1966
The 1955 (dated 1956) issue was the first Massachusetts license plate that complied with these standards.

1967 to present

Massachusetts implemented a monthly staggered registration system in 1969. Since then, serials on passenger plates have been coded by the month of expiration of the registration, determined by the last number in the serial (1 for January, 2 for February and so on up to 0 for October). From 1969 through 1977, serials with 'X' and 'Y' suffixes were used for November and December expirations respectively. Registrants are issued plates expiring the last day of the previous month (e.g. a motorist registering a vehicle in June will be issued May plates). If a vehicle is registered in December or January (so that November and December plates would be called for), leftover plates are issued from other months with manufacturing overruns.

In addition to the standard serial formats, Massachusetts also issues "reserve" plates. Reserve plates permit the plate holder to receive the same serial number when new plate styles are issued, or to transfer the serial number to family members. These plates are either all-numeric (1 through 99999) or consist of a single letter followed or preceded by a number (A 1 through Z 9999 and 1 A through 9999 Z). Reserve serials may also be of the forms A#A, A##A, #A#, and #AA#, where # represents any number, and A represents any letter. Low-number reserve plates – now called "Lottery Plates" by the RMV – are of the forms #, ##, ###, ####, A#, A##, #A, and ##A only. When a registrant cancels a low-number reserve registration, the number is placed in an annual lottery. Registration for the lottery generally begins each June, and the drawing must be held by September 15. Prior to the institution of this annual lottery, low-number reserve plates were issued only to well-connected individuals, and it is widely believed that drivers with low registration numbers were given preferential treatment by law enforcement. The annual lottery was instituted in response to complaints about the politics behind the issuance of low-number registrations. As with standard registration plates, the final digit on low-number reserve plates indicates the month of expiration.

Two-year registrations are mandatory, with the exception of vehicles initially registered during December or January. Vanity plates and motorcycle plates must be renewed annually. All vanity plate registrations expire on November 30, and all motorcycle and commercial registrations expire on December 31.

Currently, the Livery plate is the only common license plate in Massachusetts that is allowed to have more than six characters in its serials. All Livery plate serials start with the letters "LV", even if not stamped.

Because the RMV utilizes "Plate Type" to describe the type of registration, it is theoretically possible to have two plates issued with seemingly the same serial. Some of the plate types, and their three-letter codes, are listed below:

 PAN - Passenger: Normal
 PAR - Passenger: Reserved
 PAS - Passenger: Specialty (Antique, Veteran, Environmental, Sports, Spay & Neuter, Breast Cancer, United We Stand, etc.)
 PAV - Passenger: Vanity
 PAY - Passenger: Year of Manufacture (Antique plate with year stamped; AN gets added to the beginning of plate number on registration)
 CON - Commercial: Normal (plates starting SR are for snow removal; HR for Hearse)
 COR - Commercial: Reserved
 COV - Commercial: Vanity
 MCN - Motorcycle: Normal
 MCR - Motorcycle: Reserved
 MCS - Motorcycle: Specialty
 MCV - Motorcycle: Vanity
 AHN - Camper: Normal
 AHR - Camper: Reserved
 AHV - Camper: Vanity
 AMN - Ambulance: Normal (includes Animal Ambulance)
 AMR - Ambulance: Reserved
 LVN - Livery: Normal
 LVR - Livery: Reserved
 LVV - Livery: Vanity
 SPN - School Pupil: Normal
 TAN - Taxi: Normal
 TAR - Taxi: Reserved
 TRN - Trailer: Normal (not used on Camper trailers)
 TRR - Trailer: Reserved
 VPN - Van Pool: Normal
 SBN - School Bus: Normal
 SBR - School Bus: Reserved
 BUN - Bus: Normal
 BUR - Bus: Reserved
 BUV - Bus: Vanity

Current passenger baseplates
Currently, both the 1977 green-on-white base and the 1987 "Spirit" base are valid for registration. On the 1977 base, only rear plates were issued for most types (except for Reserved, Commercial and Taxi, for which front plates were also issued and must also be displayed today), whereas on the current "Spirit" base, both front and rear plates are issued. Registrants with 1977 plates have the option of replacing these with "Spirit" plates at no charge (though a different number will be used); however, most choose to keep their 1977 plates as a point of pride. In many cases, the 1977 plates are worn and illegible; legally per M.G.L. Chapter 90, a car with an illegible plate (regardless of age or color) must fail the state's annually required vehicle safety inspection. This is a safety fail, which under Massachusetts law prohibits operation of the vehicle until the issue is corrected.

Non-passenger plates

References

External links
Massachusetts license plates 1969–present
Passenger Plates Booklet July 2014. Registry of Motor Vehicles (MassDOT). Retrieved 2014-07-02.

Massachusetts
Transportation in Massachusetts
Massachusetts transportation-related lists